Rodney Phillip Dixon (born 13 July 1950) is a former New Zealand middle- to long-distance runner. He won the bronze medal in the 1500 metres at the 1972 Olympics in Munich, and in 1983 won the New York City Marathon.

Biography
Dixon was born on 13 July 1950 in Nelson, New Zealand.

He first represented New Zealand at the 1972 Summer Olympics in Munich , finishing third in the 1500 metres. At the 1974 British Commonwealth Games in Christchurch he finished fourth in the 1500 metres. His time of 3:33.89 (officially 3:33.9) was the fifth fastest ever at the time and remained Dixon's lifetime best for the distance. He then moved up to the 5000 metres and was ranked first in the world for the event in 1975 by Track & Field News magazine.

In the 5000 metres at the 1976 Montreal Olympics Dixon finished fourth behind four-time Olympic Champion Lasse Virén, teammate Dick Quax and Klaus-Peter Hildenbrand whose last second dive/fall denied Dixon a second Olympic bronze medal.

After missing the 1980 Summer Olympics due to the boycott Dixon took third place at the 1982 IAAF World Cross Country Championships.  Dixon also turned to road-running and was one of the more successful athletes on the US road racing circuit in the early '80s, including wins at the Falmouth Road Race (1980), Bay to Breakers (1982 & 1983), the Lynchburg, Virginia 10 miler (1981 & 1983), and the Philadelphia Half-Marathon (1980, 1981). His gradual move to longer distances culminated in his 1983 marathon victory in New York City. He finished 10th in the marathon at the 1984 Summer Olympics.

Unable to compete due to an injury, Dixon guided a blind runner in the 1985 Bay to Breakers. At the 1985 New York Marathon, Dixon served as the first host for the participatory "Helmet Cam" as he followed the lead pack for a mile during the race.

The boycott of the 1980 Summer Olympics lead Dixon become embroiled in a savage row with the NZ Amateur Athletic Association, he got wind of the boycott some time before it was announced and confronted NZAAA over it, teams which were to compete in the coming Olympics were in their final preparations and some athletes in teams like the rowers and hockey players were leaving their jobs so they could compete without any idea that there would be a boycott. Dixon felt that the New Zealand government had no business meddling in the Olympic games and the athletes should have been consulted and been part of the decision-making process. This rift lead to Dixon relocating to the US to compete in the road racing circuit.

After winning the New York Marathon, Pan Am put his name on the side of one of its 747s and gave him a "self-write ticket" - for first class. He used to say to his "friend", Want to go to Zurich tonight? And off they'd go, for dinner.

Personal bests

Achievements

References

External links
Biography at New Zealand Olympic Committee website
Page with Photo at Sporting Heroes

|-

1950 births
Living people
New Zealand male middle-distance runners
New Zealand male long-distance runners
New Zealand male steeplechase runners
Olympic athletes of New Zealand
Olympic bronze medalists for New Zealand
Athletes (track and field) at the 1972 Summer Olympics
Athletes (track and field) at the 1974 British Commonwealth Games
Athletes (track and field) at the 1976 Summer Olympics
Athletes (track and field) at the 1978 Commonwealth Games
Athletes (track and field) at the 1984 Summer Olympics
Commonwealth Games competitors for New Zealand
New York City Marathon male winners
New Zealand masters athletes
People educated at Waimea College
Medalists at the 1972 Summer Olympics
Olympic bronze medalists in athletics (track and field)
Sportspeople from Nelson, New Zealand